Lawrence Agyekum (born 23 November 2003) is a Ghanaian footballer who plays as a midfielder for Austrian side Liefering on loan from Red Bull Salzburg.

Club career

WAFA 
Agyekum started his career with West African Football Academy, he was promoted to the senior team in December 2019. He made his debut on 24 January 2020, after coming on for Michael Danso Agyemang in a 2–1 loss to Liberty Professionals. The 2019–20 season was however cancelled due to the restrictions to control the COVID-19 pandemic in Ghana. He made 5 league appearances before the league was cancelled. Prior to the restart of the league, he was named on the club's squad list for the 2020–21 season. He scored his debut goal on 24 February 2021, after scoring the third goal in the 92nd minute in a 3–1 victory over Karela United. Agyekum was adjudged the man of the match after putting up a good performance in a league match against Elmina Sharks even though WAFA lost by 1–0.

RB Salzburg 
On 7 February 2022, Agyekum signed a contract with Austrian club Red Bull Salzburg until 30 June 2026 and was assigned to Red Bull's partner club Liefering.

References

External links 
 

2003 births
Living people
Association football midfielders
Ghanaian footballers
West African Football Academy players
FC Liefering players
Ghana Premier League players
Ghanaian expatriate footballers
Expatriate footballers in Austria
Ghanaian expatriate sportspeople in Austria